The Zhaixing Villa is a former house in Tanzi District, Taichung, Taiwan.

Name
The name Zhaixing means plucking stars.

History
The building was constructed by Qing Dynasty General Lin Chi-chung which was started in 1871 and completed in 1879. In 1997, the former house was declared a historical building and was taken over by Taichung County Government.

Architecture
The building is a traditional courtyard house which is surrounded by garden, quadrangles and has a pond in front. It features a coffee shop and souvenir shop.

Transportation
The building is accessible within walking distance northwest of Tanzi Station of Taiwan Railways.

See also
 List of tourist attractions in Taiwan

References

1879 establishments in Taiwan
Buildings and structures in Taichung
Houses completed in 1879
Houses in Taiwan
Tourist attractions in Taichung